The 37th Separate Airborne Brigade was an airborne brigade of the Soviet and later Russian Airborne Forces. It was based in Chernyakhovsk, prior to being disbanded in 1994.

History 
The 37th Separate Air Assault Brigade was formed in October 1979 in Chernyakhovsk in the Baltic Military District. It was composed of three airborne battalions, an air assault battalion, an artillery battalion and an antiaircraft artillery battalion. The brigade was transferred to the Soviet airborne on 1 June 1990 and redesignated as an airborne brigade. Its air assault battalion was disbanded and its antiaircraft artillery battalion became a battery. In 1994, the brigade was disbanded.

References 

Military units and formations established in 1979
Military units and formations disestablished in 1994
Airborne infantry brigades of Russia
Infantry brigades of the Soviet Airborne Forces